Dennis Isherwood (born 20 January 1947) is an English former professional footballer who played in the Football League for Birmingham City.

Isherwood was born in Brierley Hill, Staffordshire. He played representative football for Brierley Hill Schools before joining Birmingham City when he left school in 1962. He turned professional two years later, and made his debut in the Second Division on 31 December 1966 in a 3–3 draw away to Norwich City. Ray Martin had been injured for some weeks, and Isherwood played at right back to allow Martin's regular deputy Bert Murray to switch to the left in place of the unavailable Colin Green. He had a run of four games in similar circumstances later that season, and scored the winning goal against Hull City in the first of these, but Martin's return to fitness pushed him down the pecking order. In 1968, he moved into non-league football with Bromsgrove Rovers and later played for Kidderminster Harriers.

After retiring from football, Isherwood took up tennis. He went on to win local doubles titles and has played for Hereford and Worcester county over-55s team.

References

1947 births
Living people
People from Brierley Hill
English footballers
Association football fullbacks
Birmingham City F.C. players
Bromsgrove Rovers F.C. players
Kidderminster Harriers F.C. players
English Football League players